Mount D’Urville is the ice-covered peak rising to 1085 m in the north foothills of Louis-Philippe Plateau on Trinity Peninsula in Graham Land, Antarctica.  It is surmounting Sestrimo Glacier to the east.

The peak is named after Captain Jules Dumont d’Urville, leader of the 1837-40 French Antarctic expedition.

Location

German-British mapping in 1996.

Map
 Trinity Peninsula. Scale 1:250000 topographic map No. 5697. Institut für Angewandte Geodäsie and British Antarctic Survey, 1996.

References
 SCAR Composite Antarctic Gazetteer.

Mountains of Trinity Peninsula